Yaeum-dong was a dong, or neighborhood, of Nam-gu in Ulsan, South Korea. Yaeum-dong was originally subdivided into 3 smaller districts: Yaeum 1-Jangsaengpo-dong, Yaeum 2-dong, and Yaeum 3-dong. In 2007, Yaeum 1-Jangsaengpo-dong was renamed Yaeum-Jangsaengpo-dong, Yaeum 2-dong was renamed Daehyeon-dong, and Yaeum 3-dong was renamed Suam-dong.

See also
Yaeum market
South Korea portal

References

External links
Official Homepage for Nam-gu

Nam District, Ulsan
Neighbourhoods in South Korea